ShKO Hockey Club, often referred to as ShKO Oskemen and literally as East Kazakhstan Region, is the farm team of Torpedo Ust-Kamenogorsk. Formerly it known as Kazzinc-Torpedo-2 (2009–2014) and Torpedo Oskemen (2014–2015). They were founded in 2009, and play in the Kazakhstan Hockey Championship, the top level of ice hockey in Kazakhstan.

Season-by-season record
Note: GP = Games played, W = Wins, L = Losses, OTW = Overtime/shootout wins, OTL = Overtime/shootout losses, Pts = Points, GF = Goals for, GA = Goals against

Head coaches
 Vladimir Belyaev 2010–11
 Igor Dorokhin 2011–12
 Maxim Komissarov 2014–present

References

External links

Kazzinc-Torpedo
Ice hockey teams in Kazakhstan